Street dogs, known in scientific literature as free-ranging urban dogs, are unconfined dogs that live in cities. They live virtually everywhere where cities exist and the local human population allows, especially in the developing world.  Street dogs may be stray dogs, pets which have strayed from or are abandoned by their owners, or may be feral animals that have never been owned. Street dogs may be stray purebreds, true mixed-breed dogs, or unbred landraces such as the Indian pariah dog. Street dog overpopulation can cause problems for the societies in which they live, so campaigns to spay and neuter them are sometimes implemented. They tend to differ from rural free-ranging dogs in their skill sets, socialization, and ecological effects.

Problems caused by street dogs

Bites
Like wolves, to survive, street dogs need to avoid conflict with humans. However, dog bites and dog attacks can occur when dogs are trying to mate or fighting among themselves, and pedestrians and other humans in the vicinity may be bitten by fighting. Rabies is a major problem in some countries. India has more than 30 million stray dogs with more than 20,000 people dying of rabies every year.

Quality of life
Barking and howling and dog fights over mating among dogs can be disturbing to people, and the smell of dog urine which is a product of territory marking may become quite pungent among un-spayed or neutered dogs, not to mention the presence of feces (toxocariasis).

Skills and adaptations

Dogs are known to be a highly adaptive and intelligent species. To survive in modern cities, street dogs must be able to navigate traffic.

Some of the stray dogs in Bucharest are seen crossing the large streets at pedestrian crosswalks. The dogs have probably noticed that when humans cross streets at such markings, cars tend to stop. The dogs have accustomed themselves to the flow of pedestrian and automobile traffic; they sit patiently with the people at the curb when they are stopped for a red light, and then cross with them as they have noticed how cars stop when a large number of people cross the road like that.

In other countries, street dogs are said to have been observed to use subway and bus services.

Free-ranging urban dogs by country

South Asia

Afghanistan
Nowzad is an organisation in Afghanistan that works to rescue stray dogs in that country. A group of stray dogs became famous in Afghanistan after confronting a suicide bomber, preventing fifty American soldiers from being killed. However, one of the surviving dogs, Target, was mistakenly euthanized when she was brought to the United States.

India

Due to the collapse of vulture populations in India, which formerly consumed large quantities of dead animal carcasses and terminated certain pathogens from the food chain, India's urban street dog populations have exploded and become a health hazard. Mumbai, for example, has over 12 million human residents, over half of whom are slum-dwellers. At least five hundred tons of garbage remain uncollected daily. Therefore, conditions are perfect for supporting a particularly large population of stray dogs.

In 2001, a law passed in India making the killing of stray dogs illegal has exacerbated the problems related to street dogs, increasing the street dog population and causing rabies cases in humans to rise. India has the highest number of human rabies deaths in the world (estimated at 20,000 per year). "Catch and kill" programmes have been a traditional solution to overwhelming dog populations, but there are also programmes such as the Animal Birth Control-Anti-Rabies (ABC-AR) programme started by Blue Cross of India based in Chennai, India. Several dog shelters throughout India emphasize the rescue of stray dogs, especially in South and North eastern parts of India.

Pakistan
In Pakistan, several dog breeds exist including the Gaddi Kutta, Indian pariah dog, Bully Kutta, among others. In the city of Lahore, the Public Health Department launched a campaign to kill 5,000 stray dogs. In 2009, 27,576 dogs were killed within the city of Lahore; in 2005, this number was 34,942. In 2012, after 900 dogs were killed in the city of Multan, the Animal Safety Organisation in Pakistan sent a letter to Chief Minister (CM) Shahbaz Sharif recommending that "stray dogs be vaccinated rather than killed."

Sri Lanka

In Sri Lanka, there is a No-Kill Policy for street dogs, hence neutering and vaccinating are encouraged. Despite the proposal for an updated Animal Welfare Act, century-old law against animal cruelty still exist, so they are subjected to cruelty in various forms.

Europe

Italy
Around 80% of abandoned dogs die early due to lack of survival skills.

Romania

In Romania, free-ranging urban dogs (called in Romanian câini maidanezi, literally "wasteland dogs", câini comunitari "community dogs", etc.) have been a huge problem in recent decades, especially in larger cities, with many people being bitten by dogs. The problem originates primarily in the systematization programme that took place in Communist Romania in the 1970s and 1980s under Nicolae Ceaușescu, who enacted a mass programme of demolition and reconstruction of existing villages, towns, and cities, in whole or in part, in order to build standardized blocks of flats (blocuri). The dogs from the yards of the demolished houses were abandoned on the streets, and reproduced, multiplying their numbers throughout the years. Estimations for Bucharest vary widely, but the number of stray dogs has been reduced drastically in 2014, after the death of a 4-year-old child in 2013 who was attacked by a dog. The Bucharest City Hall stated that over 51,200 stray dogs were captured from October 2013 to January 2015, with more than half being euthanized, about 23,000 being adopted, and 2,000 still residing in the municipality's shelters.

Russia

Stray dogs are very common in Russia. They are found both in the countryside and in urban areas. In Russia, street dogs are accepted by the common people and are even fed by the local population, including in the capital city of Moscow. However, capturing of stray dogs by doghunters' vans and being culled has been documented since around 1900. The number of street dogs in Moscow is estimated to be up to 50,000 animals. Their sad lot was dramatized by Anton Chekhov in the famous short story Kashtanka, by Mikhail Bulgakov in the novella Heart of a Dog, and by Gavriil Troyepolsky in the novel White Bim Black Ear. When the number of street dogs massively increased in the 1990s and in the beginning of the new millennium it came to many attacks on human, the dogs were captured and killed. In recent years the attitude and strategy towards street dogs has changed. The dogs are caught, sterilized and it is ensured that the dogs have enough to eat. The dogs keep the city free of food leftovers and rats. Since 2002 in Moscow there exists a monument dedicated to the stray dog called Malchik (Eng: "Little boy"). Stray dogs in Moscow have adapted their behavior to traffic and the life of Moscow. The dogs even ride the metro and understand the rules of traffic lights and are often called Moscow's metro dogs.

Serbia

Free-ranging dogs are a serious problem of the Serbian cities and rural areas. The total number of free-ranging dogs in Serbia is estimated at several tens of thousands, of which the largest groups can be found in Belgrade (more than 17,000), Novi Sad (about 10,000), Niš (between 7,000 and 10,000), Subotica (about 8,000) and Kragujevac (about 5,000).

Turkey 
While many developing countries harbor high numbers of stray dogs as a result of neglect, Turkey’s problem is a little different. In 2004, Turkish government passed a law requiring local officials to rehabilitate rather than annihilate stray dogs. The Animal Protection Law No. 5199 states a no kill, no capture policy, and unlawful euthanization are prosecutable offenses. It requires animals to be sterilized, vaccinated, and taken back to the place where they were found.

Another reason for the increase in stray dog numbers is that it is easier to adopt a dog in Turkey than in many other nations. Even "dangerous breeds" could be homed before the "dangerous dogs" bill was passed at the beginning of 2022. Still, this means the vetting process for dog ownership is not extensive. There is no real punishment for discarding dogs to streets. Istanbul, the most populous city of the country, is home to one of the highest concentrations of stray animals, with an estimated 400,000 to 600,000 dogs and cats roaming the streets. In total, it is estimated that more than 10 millions of stray dogs live in Turkey and expected to rise up to 60 million in 10 years.

North America

United States
Each year, approximately 2.7 million dogs and cats are euthanized because shelters are too full and there are not enough adoptive homes.
In 2016, between 592,255 and 866,366 street dogs were euthanized in the US.

Puerto Rico

In the late 1990s it was estimated there were 50,000 street dogs in the U.S. territory. By 2018 there were around 300,000 stray dogs in Puerto Rico. Programs to address the problem have been launched by the Humane Society of Puerto Rico and others. In 2018, a non-profit organization called Sato Project launched its first "spayathon", a large-scale project to spay and neuter  of Puerto Rico. Other initiatives include having mainland U.S. residents adopt the island dogs.

South-East Asia

Philippines
Locally known as Askals, street dogs in the Philippines, while sometimes exhibiting mixing with breed dogs from elsewhere, are generally native unbred mongrel dogs.

Thailand

See also
 Dogs portal
Coydog
Free-ranging dog
Taiwan Dog
Rez dog
Pariah dog
Wolfdog

References

Further reading
Beck, Alan M .1973. The ecology of stray dogs: A study of free-ranging urban animals. West Lafayette, Indiana: Purdue University Press e-books.
Ecollage. 2002. Dog Population Management & Canine Rabies Control. India's Official Dog Control Program in an international context. Pune. pp. 1–9
Irvine, Leslie. 2003. "The Problem of Unwanted Pets: A Case Study in How Institutions "Think" about Clients' Needs" in Social Problems. Vol. 50, No. 4, pp. 550–566
Kato Masahiko, Hideki Yamamoto, Yoshihide Inukai and Shohei Kira. 2203. "Survey of the Stray Dog Population and the Health Education Program on the Prevention of Dog Bites and Dog-Acquired Infections: A Comparative Study in Nepal and Okayama Prefecture, Japan" in Acta Med. Okayama, Vol. 57. No. 5, pp. 261–266

External links
 

Feral dogs
 
Dog, Free-ranging urban